Benjamin F. Alexander was a delegate to Alabama's 1867 Constitutional Convention and a state representative for  Greene County, Alabama during the Reconstruction era. He lived in Eutaw.

See also
List of African-American officeholders during Reconstruction

References

19th-century American politicians
Members of the Alabama House of Representatives
People from Eutaw, Alabama
African-American politicians during the Reconstruction Era
Year of birth missing
Year of death missing